Paik Too-chin or Baek Du-jin (October 7, 1908 – September 5, 1993) was a South Korean politician. He was acting prime minister until confirmed in office by the National Assembly on April 24, 1953, when he became the 4th Prime Minister of South Korea.

References

Prime Ministers of South Korea
Finance ministers of South Korea
1908 births
1993 deaths
Speakers of the National Assembly (South Korea)
Hitotsubashi University alumni
Suwon Baek clan